The Scotland national under-19 football team is the national football team representing Scotland for players of 19 years of age or under at the start of a European Under-19 Football Championship campaign. The team, which is controlled by the Scottish Football Association, acts as a feeder team to the Scotland national football team.

History
Until 2001, the European youth championship was competed for by under-18 teams. The best performance by a Scotland under-18 team was in 1982, when they won the tournament. Beating Czechoslovakia 3–1 in the final, the team was then managed by Andy Roxburgh and Walter Smith, who would both go on to manage the senior side. Scotland defeated rivals England in the qualifying round and finished top of Group 4, which also included the Netherlands. In the semi-finals, Scotland beat Poland 2–0. Scotland also reached the semi-finals of the 1978 tournament, where they lost on penalties to Yugoslavia. Scotland topped Group two – which included Germany and Italy – to qualify for the semi-final, having beaten Denmark in the qualifying round.

During the period of the under-19 format, Scotland qualified for the finals tournament in 2006 when, under the guidance of manager Archie Gemmill and coach Tommy Wilson, they lost 2–1 to Spain in the final. This performance guaranteed Scotland's participation at the 2007 FIFA U-20 World Cup (formerly the World Youth Championships), representing their first appearance for 20 years.

Since 2006, Scotland have not progressed past the elite qualification round of the European under-19 tournaments.

Coaches
Archie Gemmill (–2009)
Billy Stark (2009–12)
Ricky Sbragia (2012–15)
Scot Gemmill (2015–16)
Ricky Sbragia (2016–17)
Donald Park (2017–18)
Billy Stark (2018–present)

Competitive record

UEFA European U-19 Championship Record
 Champions   Runners-up   Third place / semi finals    Fourth place   Tournament held on home soil  

Notes
First qualifying round and Preliminary round are the same stage
Elite round, Intermediary round and Second qualifying round are the same stage
Draws also include penalty shootouts, regardless of the outcome.

Other tournaments

Current squad
The following players were named in the squad for the qualifying round of the 2023 UEFA European Under-19 Championship in November 2022.

References

External links 
 Uefa Under-19 website Contains full results archive

European national under-19 association football teams
F